State Route 229 (SR 229) is an east-west state highway in the central part of the U.S. state of Ohio.

Route description
State Route 229 runs through portions of five counties: Marion, Delaware, Morrow, Knox and Coshocton.  No part of this state highway is included within the National Highway System, a system of highways deemed most vital to the nation's economy, mobility and defense.

History
When it was first established in 1930, State Route 229 ran from its junction with State Route 61 west of Marengo to downtown Mount Vernon.  In 1937, the highway was extended on the western end to a new endpoint at U.S. Route 23 south of Waldo.  Two years later, State Route 229 was extended again, this time on the east side, to its current eastern terminus in extreme western Coshocton County west of Nellie at what was then State Route 715, which would later trade alignments with U.S. Route 36.  By 1974, the route officially took on the routing that it has today when it was extended slightly on the western end, running a short distance west of the U.S. Route 23 expressway before turning north onto the former two-lane alignment of U.S. Route 23, and following that roadway up to its current western terminus just south of Waldo where State Route 47 comes in and takes over the old routing of U.S. Route 23.

Major intersections

References

External links

State Route 229 Endpoint Photos

229
Transportation in Delaware County, Ohio
Transportation in Marion County, Ohio
Transportation in Morrow County, Ohio
Transportation in Knox County, Ohio
Transportation in Coshocton County, Ohio